Packet injection (also known as forging packets or spoofing packets) in computer networking, is the process of interfering with an established network connection by means of constructing packets to appear as if they are part of the normal communication stream. The packet injection process allows an unknown third party to disrupt or intercept packets from the consenting parties that are communicating, which can lead to degradation or blockage of users' ability to utilize certain network services or protocols. Packet injection is commonly used in man-in-the-middle attacks and denial-of-service attacks.

Capabilities 
By utilizing raw sockets, NDIS function calls, or direct access to a network adapter kernel mode driver, arbitrary packets can be constructed and injected into a computer network.  These arbitrary packets can be constructed from any type of packet protocol (ICMP, TCP, UDP, and others) since there is full control over the packet header while the packet is being assembled.

General procedure 
 Create a raw socket
 Create an Ethernet header in memory
 Create an IP header in memory
 Create a TCP header or UDP header in memory
 Create the injected data in memory
 Assemble (concatenate) the headers and data together to form an injection packet
 Compute the correct IP and TCP or UDP packet checksums
 Send the packet to the raw socket

Uses 
Packet injection has been used for:
 Disrupting certain services (file sharing or HTTP) by Internet service providers and wireless access points
 Compromising wireless access points and circumventing their security
 Exploiting certain functionality in online games
 Determining the presence of internet censorship
 Allows for custom packet designers to test their custom packets by directly placing them onto a computer network
 Simulation of specific network traffic and scenarios
 Testing of network firewalls and intrusion detection systems
 Computer network auditing and troubleshooting computer network related issues

Detecting packet injection 
Through the process of running a packet analyzer or packet sniffer on both network service access points trying to establish communication, the results can be compared.  If point A has no record of sending certain packets that show up in the log at point B, and vice versa, then the packet log inconsistencies show that those packets have been forged and injected by an intermediary access point.  Usually TCP resets are sent to both access points to disrupt communication.

Software 
 lorcon, part of Airpwn
 KisMAC
 pcap
 Winsock
 CommView for WiFi Packet Generator
 Scapy
 Preinstalled software on Kali Linux (BackTrack was the predecessor)
 NetHunter (Kali Linux for Android)
HexInject

See also 
 Packet capture
 Packet generation model
 Raw socket
 Packet crafting
 Packet sniffer

External links 
 Packet Injection using raw sockets

References 

Packets (information technology)